Nanardine railway station was a railway station on the Parkes–Narromine line. The station opened on 30 September 1914 and closed on 5 June 1976. It featured a goods loading bank. No trace of Nanardine station remains.

The line is owned by the Rail Infrastructure Corporation of New South Wales, but is managed and maintained by the Australian Rail Track Corporation under a 60-year lease signed in 2004.

References

External links 
 Pictures from nswrail.net

Regional railway stations in New South Wales